The Masters World Series of Indoor Cricket is the premier international championship of both men's and women's masters Indoor Cricket. The event is organised by the sport's governing body, the World Indoor Cricket Federation (WICF) and is held at varying intervals. The first Masters World Series contest was organised in Australia in 2001. Separate world championships are held for both junior and open age groups with the Junior World Series of Indoor Cricket and the Indoor Cricket World Cup held at similar intervals.

The World Series is contested by the members of the WICF (though member nations have not always entered teams) and beyond being an affiliated member of that body there are no formal qualifications for entry. Australia have been the most successful side with 20 collective titles.

Tournament Format
Whilst the precise nature of the tournament has varied slightly over the years, each tournament usually follows a simple round robin format followed by finals contested by the highest placed sides. The semi finals are contested by the top four sides and more often than not the winner of each semi final progresses to the World Series final.

The tournament usually takes place over the course of 7 to 10 days and is sometimes run in conjunction with the Junior World Series or other international contests. 

On occasions where insufficient nations enter sides a test series is played in place of a World Series. This occurred in 2005 and 2013 where the only entrants in the Over 30 Women division were Australia and South Africa. Whilst Australia earned the title of World Champions as a result of winning this series the tournament itself was not classified as a World Series and is therefore not included as such.

Results

See also
Indoor Cricket World Cup
Junior World Series of Indoor Cricket

Indoor cricket